Peristernia marquesana is a species of sea snail, a marine gastropod mollusc in the family Fasciolariidae, the spindle snails, the tulip snails and their allies.

Description

Distribution
This marine species occurs off the Philippines and Papua New Guinea

References

Molecular Phylogenetics and Evolution 99: 309-322

Fasciolariidae
Gastropods described in 1855